Kosovo national football team results may refer to:

Men's
Kosovo national football team results (1942–1975)
Kosovo national football team results (1993–2019)
Kosovo national football team results (unofficial matches)
Kosovo national football team results (2020–present)

Women's
Kosovo women's national football team results (2017–2019)
Kosovo women's national football team results (2020–present)

Futsal
Kosovo national futsal team results (2016–2019)
Kosovo national futsal team results (2020–present)